Dance se Puder (Dance If You Can) is a talent show produced in Brazil and aired as a segment of the Sunday program "Eliana", on SBT network. During the competition, a number of young artists known to the public compete to find out who is the best dancer. It is hosted by Eliana. Each participant has to dance to a song chosen by the producers and they have a week to learn the choreography. On stage, they are judged by Jaime Arôxa, Ivan Santos and the new judge Li Martins. The winner will earn R$50,000.

Judging 

The panel of judges is formed by three people. During the first season, only Jaime Arôxa and Ivan Santos were regular judges, accompanied by a guest. In the second season, singer Li Martins joined the panel. Their function is to make criticism of the performances and give points on a scale of 0 to 10.

Series Overview

References

Talent shows
2016 Brazilian television series debuts